Me, Myself & Irene is a 2000 American slapstick black comedy film directed by the Farrelly brothers, and starring Jim Carrey and Renée Zellweger. Chris Cooper, Robert Forster, Richard Jenkins, Daniel Greene, Anthony Anderson, Jerod Mixon and Mongo Brownlee co-star. The film is about a Rhode Island state trooper named Charlie who, after years of continuously suppressing his rage and feelings, suffers a psychotic breakdown that results in a second personality, Hank. This was Carrey's first role in a 20th Century Fox film, along with being the Farrelly brothers' second film with Carrey since Dumb and Dumber (1994).

Plot
Meek veteran Rhode Island state trooper Charlie Baileygates has been taken advantage of by those around him, including his wife Layla. Almost immediately after their wedding, she begins to cheat on Charlie with their wedding limo chauffeur, Shonté, a black dwarf with a genius-level IQ.

Despite his friends warning him of Layla's infidelity, Charlie denies it, even after she gives birth to biracial triplets, Jamal, Lee Harvey, and Shonté Jr., who also appear to be geniuses. A few years later, Layla leaves with Shonté, abandoning the children with Charlie, who raises them as his own. While they love and respect Charlie, the rest of the town continually abuses him. After years of such treatment, he develops a split personality named Hank Evans to deal with confrontations Charlie avoids.

Emerging whenever Charlie is under extreme stress, Hank is an over-the-top, rude, and violent persona reminiscent of characters played by Clint Eastwood. A psychiatrist prescribes medication to keep Hank suppressed.

Believing Charlie needs a vacation, his commanding officer orders him to escort beautiful Irene Waters from Rhode Island to Massena, New York, where she reportedly committed a hit-and-run. Irene insists her mob-connected ex-boyfriend Dickie fabricated the accusation to keep her from revealing his illegal activities to the authorities.

In Massena, Charlie turns over Irene to two EPA agents. A hitman with a contract on Irene kills one of the agents. She and Charlie flee, hastily leaving his medication behind, which causes Hank to emerge frequently. Charlie is unjustly blamed for the murder. FBI agents begin pursuing him and Irene, as do Boshane and Gerke, two crooked police officers on Dickie's payroll. The chase becomes a media spectacle, alerting Charlie's sons to his predicament.

Charlie and Irene return to Rhode Island, bonding along the way. Although Irene is taken by Charlie's personality, Hank worries her, as his aggressive personality and overestimation of his own toughness often gets them into trouble. Along the way, they pick up "Whitey", an albino waiter who claims to have killed his entire family. While stopping at a motel, Hank convinces Irene to have sex with him by impersonating Charlie. When Charlie realizes what happened the next morning, he is incensed and begins fighting with Hank. They are almost ambushed by Boshane and Gerke, but Charlie's sons, having found them, steal a police helicopter and call in a false report, stating Charlie and Irene have been apprehended in the woods nearby.

Charlie and Irene leave Whitey at the motel and board a train to Rhode Island. Dickie boards the same train, having been ordered by his police allies to "get his hands dirty". He kidnaps Irene, and Charlie chases him, working together with Hank to save her. Hank balks when Dickie heads onto a bridge, but Charlie finally faces his fears, thus permanently nullifying Hank. As Charlie tries to disarm Dickie, Dickie shoots off his thumb. Whitey then throws a lawn dart at Dickie, hitting him from behind and killing him.

Charlie and Irene fall from the bridge into the river below, where his sons arrive to rescue them. Regrouping with Whitey, Charlie apologizes for making him kill again, but Whitey reveals he made up his backstory, fearing Hank. The police arrive, quickly learning of Irene's plight. Gerke and Boshane are arrested, Charlie is praised for bringing them to justice, and Irene is cleared of the charges against her.

Irene prepares to leave Rhode Island when the police pull her over, but this is only a diversion so Charlie can propose, which she happily accepts. In a post-credits scene, everyone looks for Charlie's thumb in the river. Whitey finds it, but a fish eats it.

Cast

 Jim Carrey as Charlie Baileygates / Hank Evans
 Renée Zellweger as Irene P. Waters
 Chris Cooper as Lt. Gerke
 Robert Forster as Colonel Partington
 Richard Jenkins as Agent Boshane
 Zen Gesner as Agent Peterson
 Michael Bowman as Casper ("Whitey")
 Rob Moran as Trooper Finneran
 Daniel Greene as Dickie Thurman
 Anthony Anderson as Jamal Baileygates
 Jeremy Maleek Leggett as nine-year-old Jamal Baileygates
 Mongo Brownlee as Lee Harvey Baileygates
 Andrew Phillips as nine-year-old Lee Harvey Baileygates
 Jerod Mixon as Shonté Jr. Baileygates
 Justin Chandler as nine-year-old Shonté Jr. Baileygates
 Tony Cox as Shonté Jackson - Limo Driver
 Steve Tyler as Delivery Room Doctor
 Traylor Howard as Layla Baileygates
 Richard Tyson as Gun shop owner
 Rex Allen Jr. as the Narrator
 Ezra Buzzington as Disabled guy
 Shannon Whirry as Breastfeeding mom
 Lin Shaye (deleted scenes) as Mrs. Caleron
 Lina Teal as Bikini girl
 Anna Kournikova, Cam Neely and Brendan Shanahan appear in cameo roles
 Richard Pryor as Stand-Up Comedian on TV (archive footage) (uncredited)
 Chris Rock as Stand-Up Comedian on TV (archive footage) (uncredited)

Music 

The film's original score was written by Pete Yorn, while the movie's soundtrack contains eight covers of Steely Dan songs.

 "I'd Like That" – XTC
 "Breakout" – Foo Fighters
 "Do It Again" – Smash Mouth*
 "Deep Inside of You" – Third Eye Blind
 "Totalimmortal" – The Offspring
 "The World Ain't Slowin' Down" – Ellis Paul
 "Any Major Dude Will Tell You" – Wilco*
 "Only A Fool Would Say That" – Ivy*
 "Can't Find The Time to Tell You" – Hootie & The Blowfish
 "Bodhisattva" – Brian Setzer Orchestra*
 "Bad Sneakers" – The Push Stars*
 "Reelin' In The Years" – Marvelous 3*
 "Strange Condition" – Pete Yorn
 "Barrytown" – Ben Folds Five*
 "Razor Boy" – Billy Goodrum*
 "Where He Can Hide" – Tom Wolfe
* Steely Dan cover

"Motherfucker" by The Dwarves, "Fire Like This" by Hardknox, "Don't Say You Don't Remember" by Beverly Bremers, "The Perpetrator" by Hipster Daddy-O and the Handgrenades, "Love Me Cha Cha" by Jimmy Luxury, "Hem of Your Garment" by Cake, and "Highway Patrol" by Junior Brown were included in the movie but not on the soundtrack. Pete Yorn's "Just Another" can also be heard in the background, during the scene where they discuss Hank's idea. Alta Mira's "El Capitan" can be heard in the background during the scene where Hank fights Charlie at the train station.

Home media
The film was released on VHS on January 9, 2001, and on DVD on January 23, 2001. It was later released on Blu-ray on February 5, 2008.

Reception

Box office
The film opened at No.1 on the weekend of June 23, 2000 ahead of Chicken Run, making US$24.2 million in its opening weekend.

The film earned $90,570,999 in the United States, and a further $58,700,000 internationally, for a worldwide total of $149,270,999.

Critical response  

Review website Rotten Tomatoes gave the film a score of 48%, based on 101 reviews, and an average rating of 5.4/10, with the consensus that "While Jim Carrey's comedic skills earn some laughs, Me, Myself and Irene sports a tired, unsatisfying plot." Online review aggregator Metacritic states the film has a score of 49 out of a possible 100, based on 35 reviews, indicating "mixed or average reviews". Audiences polled by CinemaScore gave the film an average grade of "B-" on an A+ to F scale.
Carrey included the movie in his top five favourite movies of his own, coming in second behind The Cable Guy.

Controversy
On June 9, 2000, the National Alliance on Mental Illness (NAMI) sent a letter to 20th Century Fox, arguing that the film contains an inaccurate portrayal of Dissociative Identity Disorder. In the letter, NAMI executive president Lauire Flynn argued that "Me, Myself & Irene perpetuates a myth that schizophrenia—a severe, biologically-based brain disorder—is a split personality", and criticized how Fox was "seeking to dismiss such concerns with claims that the film is 'only a comedy'", stating that "for millions of Americans, schizophrenia and other mental illnesses are no laughing matter". NAMI asked Fox to release Public Service Announcements explaining real-life schizophrenia and DID, as well as Jim Carrey to explain the differences between schizophrenia and DID during interviews promoting the film.

References

External links

 
 
 
 

2000 black comedy films
2000 comedy films
2000 romantic comedy films
2000s comedy road movies
2000 films
20th Century Fox films
Albinism in popular culture
American black comedy films
American comedy road movies
American romantic comedy films
American slapstick comedy films
Films about dissociative identity disorder
Fictional trios
Films directed by the Farrelly brothers
Films set in Rhode Island
Films shot in Rhode Island
Films shot in Vermont
Films with screenplays by the Farrelly brothers
2000s English-language films
2000s American films